Jetfire is the name of several fictional characters from the Transformers franchise. He is almost always depicted as an Autobot with flight capabilities and a jet or space shuttle as an alternate mode. In some continuities he is a former Decepticon.

Transformers: Generation 1

In the many stories of Jetfire (who was referred to as Skyfire in the TV series, known in Italy as Aquila, Eagle) told through the numerous Generation 1 continuities, there is one constant aspect — an early affiliation with the Decepticons, which has served only to convince him to side with the Autobots. Jetfire's dedication to the Autobot cause is matched only by his devotion to scientific and technological advancement — this, he believes, is the only way in which victory over the Decepticons can be achieved. It is this overriding belief that tempers his bravado in battle, but nevertheless, he is often one of the most eager Autobots to plunge into combat, and his position as one of the fastest usually means he is the first to do so. Jetfire is created from the same mold as the VF-1S Super Valkyrie from the Macross series (see Toys), including the VF-1S's Gun pod, which is described as a laser on Jetfire's technical specifications. He uses a photon missile launcher in robot mode.

Animated series
In the animated series, Jetfire was called Skyfire, for reasons discussed below.

On Cybertron before the war between the Autobots and Decepticons, Skyfire was a scientist and explorer working with Starscream. Together, they investigated an uncharted planet, actually a prehistoric Earth, where they failed to find any signs of intelligent life. Skyfire wished to scrutinize the planet further, and moving in close enough to the planet, a polar wind storm swept him up and buried him beneath the Arctic ice. Starscream searched for his friend, but was unable to locate him and returned to Cybertron alone.

Millions of years later, in 1984, the Decepticons discovered the frozen Skyfire, while draining heat energy from the Earth's core and reactivated him. Reunited with his old friend, Starscream, Skyfire joined the Decepticon ranks. When the Autobots arrived, Skyfire engaged them in battle, and then rescued Sparkplug and Spike Witwicky when they became stranded on an ice floe. Unknowingly, he took the two to Megatron under the impression that he and the other Decepticons valued human life, but when Megatron took them as prisoners, Skyfire started to question his allegiance. When Starscream ordered him to destroy the captured Autobot search party, he refused, and Starscream turned his weapons on him, leaving him heavily damaged. Repaired by Ratchet, he joined the Autobots and engaged in a dogfight with Starscream which ended when he sacrificed himself to stop the core drain, burying himself in ice once again in the process.

A short time later, however, Skyfire was recovered by Wheeljack and Sideswipe, and immediately participated in an attack on the Decepticons in Peru, where the evil robots were once again attempting to use the Earth's core energy for their own means. Skyfire was almost permitted to destroy the villains' new weapon by Thundercracker, but was then blasted by Starscream (who attempted to blast Thundercracker) and repaired with some difficulty by Spike.

Skyfire would go on to make semi-regular appearances in the immediate future, helping the Autobots evacuate their base when the volcano it was embedded in became active, and flying a squad of troops to battle the Insecticons, Skyfire appeared in a few more episodes, but slowly disappeared from the cartoon, due to legal issues.

Skyfires animation model made infrequent appearances in the third season, making its final appearance in "Dark Awakening" being shot down by Quintessons in a space battle.

Books

Skyfire was featured in the 1985 audio and book adventure Satellite of Doom. His appearance matched his animated form, not the toy. During the story Skyfire is killed.

Skyfire appeared in the audio and book adventure When Continents Collide.

Comics

Devil's Due Publishing

Jetfire would also appear in the third G.I. Joe/Transformers crossover from Devil's Due Publishing. He was present with the other Autobots at the Capital City peace celebrations, battling Reflector, but was ordered off by Optimus Prime. He was later seen as part of the combined Autobot/G.I. Joe force attempting to rescue Optimus Prime.

Dreamwave Productions
In Dreamwave's 21st century re-imagining of the Generation 1 universe, Jetfire was once again presented as Starscream's friend before the Great War started. As the war broke out, Jetfire was slow to choose an allegiance, eventually siding with the Autobots. Despite the fact that he even remained with the Autobots when Optimus Prime and Megatron vanished in an early space bridge experiment and the factions splintered into smaller sub-groups, his original hesitance caused his Autobot allies to regard him with a certain degree of mistrust. Grimlock in particular bore a fierce grudge against him for an unspecified incident involving a mind-controlling cerebro-shell, and was perfectly ready to believe that he had betrayed the Autobots when he arranged a meeting with current Decepticon leader Shockwave. Jetfire was among the Transformers kidnapped by the ancient Cybertronian called the Fallen, who planned to use the genetic potential in his spark to awaken Primus, but he was freed by Grimlock, putting the grudge to rest.

Prime and Megatron subsequently returned to Cybertron, but when they and their elite crews were lost aboard the Ark, Jetfire was part of a mission to find them, along with Omega Supreme and the Micromasters Countdown and Groundshaker. When a lead emerged in the form of a beacon from the Sol system was detected, Jetfire and Omega split off from the team (who went on to investigate Decepticon attacks on other planets) and headed off after the signal. The duo entered stasis for the lengthy trip, with Jetfire eventually awakening millions of years later as their craft approached Earth. Before Jetfire could bring Omega back on-line, however, their ship was attacked by Scourge and crashed in the Arctic, where shrapnel from it killed a pod of whales. Jetfire ejected from the ship before impact and managed to seal Scourge in a booby-trapped stasis pod, but an avalanche buried both of them in ice.

At an ill-defined point in time, the Decepticons discovered Jetfire and brought the slab of ice containing him back to their underwater base. Upon returning from a trip to Cybertron with fresh plans of conquest, Starscream thawed Jetfire out to aid in repelling the maniacal Sunstorm, a clone of himself that Shockwave had created, but which had gone insane. Deducing Sunstorm's clone nature, Jetfire jury-rigged a power siphon to de-energise him, and then reactivated Omega Supreme to battle him. To save his own skin from Autobot retribution, however, Starscream had a change of heart and saved Sunstorm, who led him to a mysterious underground energy reservoir that Sunstorm intended to use to give Starscream powers like his own. Yet another double-cross by Starscream saw Sunstorm immersed in the liquid as well, and it began to destroy him from within as Jetfire engaged him in battle, leading him out into space where he exploded, apparently taking Jetfire with him.

Fun Publications

Classicverse
In the Fun Publications Classicverse stories Optimus Prime has returned to Earth commanding Bumblebee, Cliffjumper, Grimlock, Jetfire, Mirage and Rodimus (formerly Hot Rod).

In the story Crossing Over, Jetfire was among Autobot troops of Optimus Prime who responded to the sighting of Megatron and arrived in time to save the dimensional traveling Autobot Skyfall from Megatron's wraith.

In At Fight's End, Dirge, Ramjet and Thrust under the orders of Megatron. The city was defended by Ironhide, Jetfire, Optimus Prime and Sunstreaker.

IDW Publishing
Jetfire was presented as a technician and computer expert, who ran field ops during the battle of Thunderhead Pass trying to find a weakness in Thunderwing that could allow the Autobot-Decepticon army to defeat him. Many years later, he and the Technobots served as a scientific surveillance team orbiting a devastated Cybertron, monitoring it for any signs of life. The discovery of an energy spike caused Jetfire to lead the team down to the planet, where they were assaulted and captured by a team of Decepticon cultists who worshipped Thunderwing. Once freed by Optimus Prime and the Wreckers, his skills at decrypting Bludgeon's computer files uncovered an exploitable weakness in Thunderwing's new power-source, allowing Prime to eventually defeat him, and uncovered Shockwave's Energon-seeding plan Regenesis. His appearance is based on the recent redesign of the character seen in Transformers Classics toy line. He was also mentioned in Transformers: Escalation during a communication between Optimus Prime and him.

Marvel Comics

Jetfire was constructed by Shockwave on Earth to be one of his new Decepticon troops, given life through the powers of the Creation Matrix, tapped from the captive Autobot leader, Optimus Prime. However, before Shockwave could accomplish this, Prime transferred the Matrix into the mind of the Autobots' human ally, Buster Witwicky. Shockwave programmed Jetfire's lifeless shell to recover Buster, but Buster was able to use the Matrix to disassemble Jetfire before he could accomplish his goal. Buster then reconstructed Jetfire and used him to rescue Optimus Prime, who infused Jetfire with true life.

Immediately after this — in the UK's sister Transformers comic series, which interspliced its own original material between reprints of the US Marvel title — Jetfire participated in the "Dinobot Hunt", helping to track down the rogue Dinobots, who were running wild across America. Still bearing the Decepticon insignia Shockwave had stamped him with, Jetfire was not trusted by Ironhide until he saved him from the deranged Slag, proving his Autobot loyalty.

Subsequently, in the US title, he underwent the Rite of Autobrand and was branded with the Autobot insignia at last.

Jetfire went on to perform few significant actions in the future (although he did serve as the Autobots' acting leader against Galvatron in the Target:2006 storyline), but was clearly thoroughly accepted into the Autobots, as his was one of the small number of voices heard when a new Autobot leader had to be chosen, and Dinobot leader Grimlock was elected.

A story called The Gift in issue 93 of the Marvel UK comics explored Jetfire's problems fitting in with the other Autobots. Wheeljack informed Optimus Prime of a news cast where they learned the Decepticons had taken over a NASA space monitoring facility near the Ark. Prowl and Trailbreaker, with Jetfire as backup engaged the Decepticons Soundwave, Kickback and Dirge as the Decepticons attempted to contact Cybertron with the facility's deep space radio equipment. Although Prowl ordered Jetfire to stop Soundwave from sending his message, Jetfire ignored the order to help save Prowl from Kickback's attack. With the transmission sent the Decepticons retreated victorious. Jetfire then accompanied Jazz to a Blackrock fuel plant to oversee the creation of more fuel for the Autobots. The plant was attacked by Decepticons Thrust and Bombshell. Although Jetfire was able to put out a fire at the plant before it exploded, he blamed himself for being slow to react. Jetfire then visited Buster Witwicky on Christmas Eve and tell him of his troubles of not fitting in with the Cybertronian-made Autobots. Buster encouraged the young Autobot by telling him he's the first of a new generation of Earth-made Autobots and he should be proud of what he is.

In issue #27 (US), "King of the Hill!", Perceptor summoned his fellow Autobots Blaster, Hot Spot, Jetfire, Omega Supreme, Ratchet and Silverbolt in order to decide who should take leadership of the Autobots. After an attack by the giant Decepticon Trypticon the leader was chosen - Grimlock.

Sometime later, Jetfire was among the Transformers who attempted to defend New York City from the cosmically-powered Starscream, only to be deactivated alongside everyone else. Unlike most of Starscream's victims, there was no indication that he was revived through the power of nucleon.

Games
The Robots in Disguise Classic line appeared in a simple Flash-based video game on the Hasbro web site called Transformers Battle Circuit. In this one-on-one fighting game you press the right and left arrow keys to try to overpower your opponent. In the game you can play Rodimus, Bumblebee, Grimlock, Jetfire, Starscream, Astrotrain, Trypticon or Menasor. Optimus Prime and Megatron each appear as the boss you must defeat to win the game.

He also featured as a playable character in Glu's android game: Transformers G1 - Awakening

Other media
Marge Simpson appeared as Skyfire in one opening sequence to the Simpsons alongside the rest of the Simpson family rendered as Autobots.

Skyfire briefly appears among the characters in Re-Unification, the 2010 TFcon voice actor play prelude comic.

Toys
 Generation 1 Jetfire (1985)
The first two years of Transformers toys were figures taken from older Japanese toylines, primarily Takara's Diaclone and Microman lines. 1985, however, saw several figures reused from lines created by Takatoku Toys, of which Jetfire was one — that of the VF-1S Super Valkyrie Fighter from the Macross series. This figure was one of the most articulated of the early Transformer toys, featuring fully poseable shoulder, hip, elbow and knee joints, and even poseable sacroiliac joints. The instruction manual for the toy even included the GERWALK mode designed for the Macross version of the toy, which was used in that animated series, and seen briefly in the Transformers season 2 episode "The Day of the Machines".
Problems over the Jetfire toy began when Bandai absorbed Takatoku Toys, and Macross regained popularity, leading to Bandai's desire to reproduce the Valkyrie toy themselves. This led to problems for Takara when they imported the Transformers toyline — although Hasbro was able to market the Jetfire toy in their markets, Takara was not, nor could they promote it via the animated series, since the mold was owned by their main competitor, and therefore, it was viewed as potential free advertising for Takatoku (this issue also prevented the Deluxe Vehicles, Deluxe Insecticons, Omega Supreme, and Sky Lynx from being released in Japan, though after Takara merged with Tomy, the latter two were finally released in Japan). Although an animation model had been created for Jetfire based on the appearance of the toy (which could be seen in the original toy commercial advertising the figure), this was quickly abandoned and completely redesigned so as to no longer resemble the Valkyrie. This was the design that went on to feature in the comics and cartoons.
Jetfire only saw a few American production runs, as the show the original toy was based upon, The Super Dimension Fortress Macross, was exported to America to become the first third of Robotech. Ironically, since Hasbro released Jetfire first, there was never a U.S. release of an authentic transforming version of the toy for Robotech, even though the design was the series' most recognizable and popular mecha. As with other pre-Robotech borrowings from Macross (for instance, BattleTech), the licensing situation for the toy became murky with two different companies (Big West and Tatsunoko Production) asserting exclusive rights to license Macross merchandise outside Japan. Due to these legal issues, Jetfire has not been among the Transformers toys reissued in the 21st century, instead being offered as part of the War For Cybertron: Siege toyline in his cartoon/comic design.
This toy is patented in the U.S. as patent number D287037.
 Generation 2 Cyberjet Jetfire (1995)
The first new Jetfire in a decade was a member of the Cyberjets, highly poseable, ball-jointed jets with pressure-activated launching missiles. A repaint of the Decepticon figure released at the same time named Hooligan -- and consequently erroneously decorated with Decepticon symbols -- this figure bore some physical resemblance to his original (unarmored) self, although his color scheme and missile launcher arm drew attention away from his familiar shape. His tech spec bio made it clear that this was still the same Jetfire as before. Cyberjet Jetfire could be partially transformed into a forward-kneed "gerwalk" mode, but his rear wings and tail made the figure too top-heavy to stand upright for very long.
 Robot Masters R-Blade (2004)
Cyberjet Jetfire figure was redecoed in 2004 for the Japanese-exclusive Transformers: Robot Masters toyline as R-Blade, in a red, white and black color scheme that was a direct homage to the original Jetfire. The bio of this figure specifically noted that Jetfire was the leader of the Cyberjets, although the original figure's bio made no mention of it. R-Blade comes with the missile weapon as a sonic lance and a flare gun.
 Titanium 6 inch Jetfire (2006)
Released in the second wave of the die-cast metal Transformers: Titanium line, this 6" version of Jetfire is based on his Cybertronian mode from Dreamwave's War Within comic book series.
 Classics Voyager Jetfire (2007)
Part of the second wave of releases for the Transformers Classics toy line, this incarnation of Jetfire has a removable booster pack and helmet; with them attached (and excluding the translucent blue missiles), the toy looks much like the Macross (Super) Valkyrie-based original. Without them, he is closer to Skyfire's appearance on the Generation 1 cartoon. His double-barreled rifle was also made to resemble Skyfire's weapon from the cartoon. Some fans have also found a sort of "hidden" mode with the Classics figure. Due to the toy's unusual hip design, it can be configured into a Gerwalk-like mode, although no official public documentation by Hasbro, on the website or instruction sheet, specifies this. Without armor, Jetfire's vehicle mode resembles an F-14 Tomcat, with exhaust design elements inspired by the F-22 Raptor.
A printing error on the back of the Classic Grimlock box used Jetfire's picture as one of his co-sells, but listed him as the Decepticon Astrotrain.
This toy was remolded into the BotCon 2007 exclusive Timelines Dreadwind and the 2008 Universe Series Tread Bolt.

 Classics Legends Jetfire (2007)
First seen at Botcon 2006, the Legends Jetfire is a repaint of Cybertron Legends Thundercracker in the traditional colors of Jetfire.
This version of Jetfire turns into an SU-27 Flanker jet.
 Henkei! Henkei! C-06 Voyager Cybertron Skyfire (2008)
The Japanese version of the Classics Voyager figure by Takara Tomy is virtually identical to the Hasbro version.
 Gentei! Gentei! Voyager Dark Skyfire (2009)
Exclusive to Toy Hobby Market in Japan, this is a dark gray/purple redeco of Classics Voyager Jetfire as a Decepticon.
 Transformers Kabaya Gum Skyfire (2010)
Part of Wave 2 of Kabaya's Transformers candy toy line. The package comes with an easy-to-assemble robot kit and a stick of gum. The Jetfire toy in this line is a simplified version of the Universe/Henkei figure.
 Generations Leader Jetfire (2014)
An all-new mold of Jetfire released as part of the Transformers franchise's 30th anniversary offerings. The figure incorporates design elements of the original 1984 toy and Skyfire's animation art.

Transformers: Robots in Disguise

The 2001 Robots in Disguise Deluxe Skyfire w/ Tow-Line included a Jetfire as a redeco of the Machine Wars Skywarp/Thundercracker mold. Skyfire transforms from a Dassault Rafale fighter jet to robot mode with a single-step, spring-loaded transformation. The two halves of his rifle store in his lower legs in jet mode. He was only available in a Deluxe-level two-pack with Tow-Line. This mold was also used to make Beast Wars II Dirge, Robot Masters Wingstun and BotCon 2006 exclusive Darkside Waspinator.

Unicron trilogy

In Transformers: Armada, Jetfire serves as Optimus Prime's second-in-command, with a witty, cheerful personality that helps to bridge the distance between Prime as leader and his troops. The friendly nature that keeps him popular amongst the Autobots hides a strong sense of intelligent judgment that has saved his team from numerous predicaments, and means that he will even speak up and tell Prime that he is wrong to his face.

Animated series

Transformers: Armada
In this series, he is very boastful. When Optimus Prime led a small force to Earth to investigate the Mini-Con signal emanating from that world, Jetfire was left in charge on Cybertron, but eventually later departed the planet to join his commander on Earth. Arriving shortly after the Decepticon tactician Thrust, Jetfire scanned an Earthen space shuttle upon approach to the planet and burst onto the scene in the middle of a battle, his energetic and unexpected arrival completely throwing off Thrust's meticulous plan and allowing the Autobots to claim victory. When Thrust arranged the next Decepticon attack on the Autobots, Jetfire once again proved to be the monkey wrench in his plan when he and Optimus Prime revealed their ability to combine together, once again foiling the villain's schemes. Although, Optimus Prime said "Jet Convoy" the first time they combined, later in the series he referred to it as Jet Optimus.

Jetfire's unique space-flight abilities make him a distinct asset to the Autobot forces, allowing them to recover a Mini-Con from Mars. He journeys there together with Starscream who had joined the Autobots at that time. Jetfire is displeased that the turncoat Decepticon will keep his company, but he cannot do anything about it, for Starscream simply takes off the first and leaves him behind. So Jetfire has the only alternative to follow "this brainless robot" reluctantly. On the way to Mars, however, he loses sight of Starscream and finds him only with the aid of the Air Defense Mini-Con Team. He invites Starscream to look for the Mini-Con together, but the latter refuses. Then Jetfire arrests and shackles Starscream for insubordination. While Jetfire tows his prisoner back to Earth, Megatron and Tidal Wave attack them. But, in spite of their disagreement, Jetfire and Starscream prove to be capable of acting as a team. So they succeed in resisting the enemy and in rescuing the Mini-Con.

It is noteworthy that after Starscream refuses his help, though being seriously damaged, Jetfire remarks that he is "stubborn as usual"; supposedly, he had already got to know Starscream's nature well enough.

When Optimus Prime dies at the hands of the Decepticon super-weapon, the Hydra Cannon, Jetfire steps down to allow Hot Shot to assume command, retaining his secondary position even when Prime was returned to life by the power of the Mini-Cons. Jetfire goes on to participate in the "Unicron Battles," when the planet-eating giant robot Unicron attacks Cybertron, and returns the Autobots' human allies Rad, Carlos and Alexis to Earth after the battle is won.

Transformers: Energon
Over the ensuing decade, Jetfire (now called Skyfire in Japan) received an upgrade into a new body-form, and received the Spark of Combination from Primus, allowing him to combine with other Autobots, most frequently the rookie trooper Ironhide, who he had to carefully train and walk through the combination process. Despite his external changes, however, Jetfire remained consistent in personality and outlook, always ready with a witty remark to keep the mood light even in the middle of a pitched battle. He is once again, the second-in-command of the Autobots.

When the resurrected Unicron came under the control of Megatron, Primus used his powers to permanently super-charge some of the Autobots, Jetfire included, recoloring their armor. The resultant battle saw Unicron's body destroyed, but his spark endured and possessed Megatron — now Galvatron - who grew to colossal size. In order to combat the giant villain, Jetfire and the Autobots took their Spark of Combination to the ultimate extreme, transforming their bodies into pure energy and merging with Optimus Prime, enlarging him to similar proportions and allowing him to battle Galvatron directly. Ironically it was Galvatron who was ultimately the instrument of Unicron's defeat when he plunged himself into an energon sun created by Primus in order to stop Unicron from taking over his body permanently.

Transformers: Cybertron
In order to recuperate after the stresses of the final battle against Unicron, Jetfire (Dreadrock in Japan, a new character there, not the same as the Jetfire from Superlink, but is still the Autobot's second-in-command) took some time out to vacation of the planet of Nebulos, where he inadvertently picked up the local accent (resembling Earthen Australian). His relaxation was brought to an end, however, when Primus's energon sun collapsed in on itself, forming a gigantic black hole that threatened the safety of Cybertron.

Returning to the planet, Jetfire helped the Autobots there evacuate, relocating once more to Earth, where he suggested the Autobots revisit the idea of taking on Earthly vehicle alternate modes to hide themselves from the populace, adopting for himself a new cargo plane alternate mode. He went on to develop a rivalry with Decepticon Thundercracker over who was the superior flyer. Jetfire was Optimus Prime's second-in-command in this series, and was rather cocky. Jetfire participated in many of the battles on Earth, Cybertron and Giant Planet.

In the episode "Warp", It is revealed that he has a fear of needles (trypanophobia).

In the episode "Unfinished", when the Autobots attempted to use a gigantic rocket to move the Animatros back into its orbit, Galvatron attacked and damaged the rocket. The jungle planet threatened to crash into Cybertron. Scourge, the Autobots, the former Decepticons, and their allies from the various planets were able to combine their strength and move the rocket back into place.

After the threat of the black hole was thwarted, he was appointed leader of Cybertron in Optimus Prime's absence.

Jetfire wields two guns, and is able to generate twin whirlwinds from his shoulders. His Earth-type Cyber Key activates twin missiles in his back. Later, the Jetfire toy was repainted as a Decepticon named Sky Shadow. His bio says that Sky Shadow is actually an undercover Jetfire.

Dreamwave Productions

Transformers: Energon
Over the following decade, Jetfire retained his position as Autobot second in command through the Autobot/Decepticon alliance. Unicron's threat, however, had not been ended, as was proven when the Terrorcons; dissident Decepticons given new powers through Unicron's intermediary agent, Alpha Quintesson; attacked the AlterEnergy research facility on Earth and Jetfire, now equipped with the Spark of Combination, joined the other Autobots in defending it and its human occupants.

The Terrorcon threat underwent sudden, horrific multiplication when they were cloned through Unicron's power, and massive swarms of them assaulted key cities across Earth. Jetfire petitioned the High Council to allow more troops and energon to be dedicated to Earth, and it was only through the efforts of council member Avalon that his appeal was accepted. A large strike force under Jetfire's command was assembled and sent to Earth, with Jetfire taking a portion of the team (Bulkhead, Cliffjumper, Landquake, Perceptor and Tow-Line) to Los Angeles. Despite fighting a tough battle, it was soon apparent that the Autobots were not going to win, until Megatron; reborn in a vastly powerful new body; came blasting onto the scene and shattered the Terrorcon forces, allowing Autobot victory.

IDW Publishing
IDW's Transformers Collectors Club exclusive comic story, "Revelations Part 6", is set after the defeat of Galvatron but before Optimus Prime's mission to start a new Space Bridge project. In this story the Autobots from the Fun Publications stories (Robots in Disguise Optimus Prime, Ultra Magnus, Sentinel Maximus, Downshift, Perceptor, Alpha Trion, Over-Run, Anti-Blaze, Checkpoint, and Scythe) meet the Autobots from the animated series (Cybertron Optimus Prime, Jetfire, Override, Scattorshot, Red Alert, Hot Shot, Lori, Bud, and Coby Hansen) and thank each other and remembering those who were lost in the battles.

Toys
 Armada Jetfire with Comettor (2002)
Jetfire transforms into a space shuttle; the landing gear becomes a shield for his robot mode, while one of the three thrusters becomes a large gun with electronic engine and laser noises. Jetfire is packaged with the Mini-Con Comettor, who transforms into a lunar rover and mounts as landing gear for Jetfire in shuttle mode. When plugged into the gun/thruster, Comettor triggers two spring-loaded tail fins to pop out, and switches the laser noise to a "5-4-3-2-1" countdown. When plugged into the shuttle's wings, Comettor causes two bombs to drop, which can also be stored in other inactive slots. Jetfire can also transform into a set of legs, atop which Optimus Prime's super mode torso can attach, forming Jet Optimus (Jet Convoy in Japan).
A special Target store exclusive bonus pack of Armada Jetfire with Commetor came with the Space Team Mini-Cons Payload, Skyblast and Astroscope.
According to the Transformers Collectors Club magazine, the vehicle mode of this Jetfire is inspired by the X-71 Shuttle from the 1998 film Armageddon.
  Armada Powerlinx Jetfire with Comettor (2003)
A blue and white redeco of the Armada Jetfire figure, representing Jetfire in his enhanced body, as seen in the Transformers: Armada comic books.
A redeco of this mold was intended for release in Transformers: Universe as the Decepticon Spacewarp, but this was canceled. A slightly altered version of this toy was later revived as an exclusive for the Official Transformers Collectors Club, as the classic Decepticon Astrotrain, with a new head sculpt to resemble the character's classic head design.
 Energon Jetfire (2004)
The new Energon incarnation of Jetfire features a spring-loaded missile launcher and undercarriage grabber claws. The figure bears a golden Powerlinx symbol, meaning that it can combine with other figures of the same size, forming either a torso or legs to do so. Connecting the figure with another produces an electronic linking noise, while pushing down on Jetfire's head yields a sped-up version of the classic "transformation" sound. The toy can also link with smaller silver Powerlinx figures, but the results are disproportionate, and not used in the animated series, comics, or the figure's English instructions.
 Micron Legends Skyfire S (2005)
Another blue and white Jetfire redeco, this time of the Energon toy. Released in Japan as "Skyfire S" (the "S" stands for "Sonic"), it represents the character in his upgraded form from the animated series. The toy was also released in Hasbro markets, but as a different character named Overcast, Jetfire's brother.
 Cybertron Ultra Jetfire (2005)
The new Cybertron incarnation of Jetfire is armed with twin firing missile launchers, which mount under his wings in plane mode. Pressing on the rear of his tail engines activates an electronic engine noise, while flipping the tail section up changes the noise to a shrill laser blast. Inserting the figure's Earth Cyber Planet Key into the tail section causes a pair of twin guns to pop up, changing the noise once more, into an explosive blast. The toy features some auto-transforming features — by snapping the nosecone into the hips during the transformation into robot mode, two small missile cluster launchers are popped out, while straightening the arms at the elbows automatically extends the fists.
Like most toys sold in the Galaxy Force toy line by Takara, then later in the Cybertron toy line by Hasbro, there are small paint differences between the two versions of the toy. The Hasbro version has a code number on the back of his Cyber Key, while the Takara version has no number on his Force Chip.
This toy was recolored into 2007 live-action movie Jetstorm.
This toy stands 19 centimeters tall in robot mode. In the animated series Jetfire is depicted as standing 24 feet (or 732 centimeters) tall. This would make this toy 1/39 scale if you base the toy on the size depicted in the show.
A real An-225 has a wing span of 8840 centimeters, while this toy has a wingspan of 27 centimeters, making this toy have a scale of about 1/327 of the real world vehicle. With the toy robot mode standing 19 centimeters tall, the actual robot mode of this character would stand about 6220 centmeters (204 feet) tall.

 Cybertron Burger King Jetfire (2005)
A small simple version of Cybertron Jetfire was sold with Burger King kids meals.
 Cybertron Legends Jetfire (2006)
A small version of the larger Cybertron Jetfire toy, this figure features a simplified transformation scheme that imitates the bigger figure. In 2007 a Target store exclusive value pack of four Voyager class Cybertron toy was released. It included Jetfire, Megatron, Optimus Prime and Soundwave. All identical to their original releases.
This toy stands 8.5 centimeters tall in robot mode. In the animated series, Jetfire is depicted as standing 24 feet (or 732 centimeters) tall. This would make this toy 1/86 scale.
Repainted in 2007 as Classic Legends Fireflight (Transformers).
 Cybertron Ultra Sky Shadow (2006)
A recolor of the Cybertron Jetfire figure in tan, black and maroon, this figure represents Jetfire in a Decepticon guise used for under cover missions. The name is a reference to the Beast Wars Predacon Sky Shadow, whose name Jetfire apparently found in the Cybertron Archives — although quite how he would have found information about an individual from a different continuity is puzzling at best (leading one to believe that the name may actually be a reference to Sky Shadow from Transformers Energon). Because this recolor was a Hasbro exclusive made after the animated series was already produced in Japan, he did not appear in the television series.
 Transformable Robot Armor Battleplane (2007)
A Chinese-made unofficial toy based on the Legends of Cybertron Jetfire in a larger size and with slightly different colors. Came with an additional rifle accessory. Available at discount stores like Big Lots.

Transformers 3D Battle Card game (2007)

Jetfire is among the characters which first appeared in the 2007 Transformers 3D Battle Card game by Wizards of the Coast. A red and white redeco of movie Starscream, this incarnation of Jetfire is not related to the character in the 2009 film Transformers: Revenge of the Fallen.

Toys
 Transformers 3D Battle Card Jetfire (2007)
An Autobot redeco of the Starscream card. His alternate mode is a jet fighter based on an F-22 Raptor.

Transformers Cinematic Universe

In a USA Today online fan poll following the release of the 2007 live-action film, Jetfire was one of the 10 Transformers that the fans wanted in the sequel, coming in 4th with 11% of the votes.

Jetfire appears in Transformers: Revenge of the Fallen and transforms into a Lockheed SR-71 Blackbird. He is portrayed as a former Decepticon who becomes an Autobot because he did not believe in all the destruction and violence the Decepticons were dedicated to. Originally serving the Fallen, Jetfire is one of the few Transformers to remain on Earth since the dawn of humanity.

According to the biography and statistics published on the Hasbro web site, Jetfire is 50 feet tall and his main weapon is a battle-axe. In the film, he also has a missile launcher. As an emphasis on his old age, he carries a walking stick that transforms into the front landing gear of his jet mode. In the film, he can project hologram clips from the palm of his left hand similar to how Optimus Prime did in the 2007 film through his eyes.

IDW Publishing
Jetfire was spotlighted in Tales of the Fallen issue #3. He was depicted as a member of the Decepticons under the leadership of the Fallen, serving the villain due to being tricked as to believe he was working for Cybertron's benefit. However, when the other Primes confronted the Fallen on Earth, Jetfire realized his mistake and was teleported to an unknown location. Jetfire fought many other ancient Decepticons there and eventually went into stasis after his victory. He awakened in the mid 20th century and scanned an SR-71 Blackbird before returning to stasis. His Decepticon insignia was unchanged even when he switched sides to the Autobots.

In Defiance issue #4, which is a prequel to the movie series, a younger Jetfire is seen in his Cybertronian mode, traveling the galaxy for star-orbited planets, in a flashback told by the Fallen to Megatron.

Books
In the novel adaptation of Revenge of the Fallen, Jetfire is confronted just after arriving in Egypt by his fellow Decepticon Seeker Ransack. After firing off an ineffective round at Jetfire, Ransack is crushed under Jetfire's foot.

Movie plot

Jetfire is found by Sam Witwicky, Mikaela Banes and Seymour Simmons at the Steven F. Udvar-Hazy Center, an annex of the National Air and Space Museum, after Wheelie pinpoints the general location of the ancient Seeker. Sam reactivates him with an Allspark fragment, waking him up from stasis lock. After a misunderstanding when the humans saw his Decepticon insignia, Jetfire activates a Space Bridge to teleport Sam and his friends to Egypt, explaining to them the origin of the Primes (who he seems to have a certain type of respect for) and the Matrix of Leadership. Learning of Optimus Prime's existence and death, Jetfire sends them to find the Matrix, which he speculates can be used to revive Optimus (Although it could also be used to power the Fallen's technology).

He later joined the Autobots in battling the Decepticon forces in Egypt, killing the Decepticon weapons expert Mixmaster, before being badly injured by Scorponok. In a final act of sacrifice, he took his own life to enable Optimus to use his parts for an upgrade for his battle with the Fallen.

Games
Jetfire is a playable character in the PS2 and Wii versions of the Transformers: Revenge of the Fallen video game and is in the new downloadable content pack for the PS3 and Xbox 360. He is only playable in multiplayer mode.

He also appeared in the video game Transformers: Rise of the Dark Spark.

Toys
All toys of this character are officially licensed from Lockheed Martin.

 Revenge of the Fallen Legends Class Jetfire (2009) In September 2008, pictures of a mold for a Legends Class Jetfire appeared online. Jetfire transforms into a SR-71 Blackbird and can also combine with Legends Class Optimus Prime on his back. This toy was seen on the internet in package as a Decepticon in December 2008.
 Revenge of the Fallen War for the Skies Legends Class Jetfire (2009) A silver redeco of the Legends Class figure. Bundled in a Kmart exclusive Legends gift set with Autobot Blades, Thundercracker and Spinister.
 Revenge of the Fallen Fast Action Battlers Photon Missile Jetfire (2009) A Deluxe Class-sized figure of Jetfire with simplified transformation for younger children.
 Revenge of the Fallen Robot Replicas Jetfire (2009) A smaller, non-transforming action figure.
 Revenge of the Fallen Leader Class Jetfire (2009) A larger version of Jetfire (and the largest of the Leader Class), with MechAlive technology and a more complex transformation procedure. Features electronic lights and sounds, and says "Jetfire's my name." in a Scottish accent. Also combines with the newer Leader Class Optimus Prime.
 Revenge of the Fallen Jetpower Optimus Prime with Leader Class Jetfire (2009)
An Asia-exclusive gift set featuring a black/gold redeco of Jetfire with Buster Optimus Prime.
 Revenge of the Fallen Leader Class Power Up Optimus Prime Value Pack (2010) A Hasbro Toy Shop exclusive gift set featuring Leader Class Optimus Prime and Jetfire. Unlike the Asia-only gift set, this package features the regular figures and not the Buster Prime or repainted Jetfire variants.
 Transformers The Victory of The Fallen Legends Class Jetfire (2010) A black/silver redeco of the Legends Class figure. Bundled with Legends Class figures of Optimus Prime, The Fallen, Megatron and Starscream.
 Dark of the Moon Jetpower Optimus Prime with Leader Class Jetfire (2011) A re-release of the Asia gift set for the DOTM toyline. None of the figures were changed.
 Age of Extinction Scientist Class G1 Jetfire (2014) A new mold of Jetfire in G1 colors

Transformers: Animated

Concept art for an Animated rendition of Jetfire, as well as Jetstorm, was shown at BotCon 2008, revealing Jetfire to be a yellowish-colored robot and Jetstorm to be a blue-colored robot. He has goggle-like pieces on their foreheads and they both transform into jets. Jetstorm and his brother Jetfire are Autobot twins who have been fitted with technology scanned from Starscream while he was in Elite Guard captivity.

They have the power to create powerful whirlwinds in both robot and jet modes. Jetfire has the ability to combine with Jetstorm, forming Safeguard. In their combined vehicle mode they resemble an X-wing fighter from Star Wars. The two are enthusiastic young fighters, but do tend to rush into things. He speaks with both the twins' voices simultaneously.

Both Jetfire and Jetstorm are the youngest members of the Elite Guard of all time. Both Jetfire and Jetstorm speak with Russian accents. Apparently they are Sentinel Prime's soldiers, obeying his every command. The twins' merging into Safeguard is similar to ChoRyuJin of The King of Braves GaoGaiGar.

Animated series
He first appeared in "Where is Thy Sting?". Both he and Jetstorm speak with Russian accents. Apparently they are Sentinel Prime's soldiers, obeying his every command. The two also appear to have a kiddy sense of fun and amusement, as shown when Bumblebee plays a video game against Wasp to determine who is who. They both raise their hands and state that they will play the winner.

Jetfire reappeared in "Five Servos of Doom". Jetstorm wanted Jetfire to scan a picture of him in front of the recently captured Decepticon Blitzwing "for the Femme-bots back home". He then asked how Sentinel Prime captured Blitzwing. He was later seen with Jetfire trying to make the communicator work. He directed Prowl and Jazz to the Elite Guard flagship's brig, where Sentinel had just captured Lugnut. He also appeared with Jetfire in a baseball stadium, where Sentinel was working with Lockdown. Jetstorm combined into Safeguard and helped rescue Sentinel, who was now in the hands of Ramjet. Jetstorm was present when Prowl used Processor Over Matter to lift the rubble of the scoreboard off of him.

In "Predacons Rising", Bumblebee, Jetfire, Jetstorm, Optimus Prime, and Sentinel Prime chase Wasp, but lose him to Swoop while bickering about what to do with him. The group follow them to Blackarachnia's lab, and, in the ensuing battle, Jetstorm and Jetfire hand the Dinobots a crushing defeat. In this episode after following Sentinel's orders, which got him buried headfirst in the sand, Jetfire asks, "Should we be taking notes?" to which Jetstorm replies, "On what not to do?"

Jetfire and his twin appeared in "Decepticon Air", fighting back against the escaped Decepticons captured on Earth.

They appeared again in "This is Why I Hate Machines", surprised to see Ratchet and Captain Fanzone on Cybertron. They reluctantly followed Sentinel's orders to organize a strike against Omega Supreme (containing Megatron, Starscream, and Lugnut), who had recently transwarped above Cybertron.

Toys
Animated Deluxe Jetfire and Jetstorm set (2008)
A Deluxe Class boxed set of Jetfire and Jetstorm. Both figures transform into jets and can combine into Safeguard.

Animated Set G Safeguard (TA-21 Jetfire and TA-22 Jetstorm) (Takara Tomy) (2010)
The 2010 Japan release version by Takara Tomy. On this version, Jetfire sports a metallic silver finish, while Jetstorm has blue chrome parts.

Aligned Continuity

Jetfire is a member of the Aerialbots, but does not seem to make up any part of Superion. He was formerly a neutral Scientist until Starscream betrayed him and joined the Decepticons; in retaliation, Jetfire joined the Autobots.

Books
Jetfire appears in the novels Transformers: Exodus and Transformers: Retribution. A former Seeker, Jetfire chooses to side with the Autobots rather than joining the Decepticons along with most of his fellow Seekers and becomes one of a handful of Autobots who are flight capable. He proves to be a valuable asset, and remains behind on Cybertron to aid the Wreckers when the Ark departs. Despite his valiant efforts, some Autobots-notably Wheeljack-continued to doubt his loyalty and suspected that he was a double-agent for the Decepticons. Jetfire proved his loyalty by joining a mission under Ultra Magnus to rescue Alpha Trion from Shockwave.

Games
Jetfire is one of the playable Autobots in the 2010 video game Transformers: War for Cybertron, and speaks with an English accent (similar to his film incarnation). In the Decepticon campaign, he starts out as one of Starscream's partners in charge of guarding the dark energon. He also tries to warn Megatron about the deadly effects of dark energon, but his cries fall on deaf ears, as the Decepticon leader immerses himself in it, becoming more powerful. After that Starscream turns his allegiance to Megatron. Jetfire fled the scene, joining the Autobots.

In the Autobot campaign, Jetfire joins Air Raid and Silverbolt in flying in orbit of Cybertron to take down the armed Decepticon orbital station Trypticon, which is preventing Autobot transport ships from leaving the dying planet. The aerial trio enter Trypticon and destroy his cooling systems and plasma reactor, disabling his main weapon. Unfortunately, the attacks are not enough to disable Trypticon, so they enter his core and destroy his transformation cog, forcing him to revert into his true form. Forced to transform into dinosaur mode, Trypticon sets a course toward the Autobot city of Iacon with the intent of decimating it, but the Autobot trio destroy his flight pack, sending him crashing into the planet. This leaves Optimus Prime and his ground-based team with the task of finishing off Trypticon before he lays further waste on Iacon.

Jetfire is playable in the last level of Transformers: Fall of Cybertron. The player's mission as Jetfire is to destroy the Decepticon tow cables, and helped Jazz knock Bruticus off the Ark.

References

General references

External links
 Jetfire at TFWIKI.Net, the Transformers Wiki

Articles about multiple fictional characters
Fictional aircraft
Fictional scientists
Fun Publications characters
Male characters in animated series
Robot characters in video games
Transformers characters
Video game bosses